Busenitz is a surname. Notable people with the surname include:
 Alan Busenitz (born 1990), American baseball player